{{Infobox MEP
| name                = Kinga Gál
| honorific-suffix    = MEP
| image               = Kinga Gal EPP Political Assembly, 4 June 2018.jpg
| caption             = Kinga Gál in June 2018
| office              = Member of the European Parliament
| term_start          = 1 July 2004
| term_end            = 
| constituency        = Hungary
| birth_name          = 
| birth_date          = 
| birth_place         = Cluj-Napoca, Romania
| death_date          = 
| death_place         = 
| party               = Fidesz| spouse              = Máté Gál
| children            = 
| alma_mater          = Eötvös Loránd University
| website             = gal.fidesz-eu.hu/en
}}Kinga Gál''' (born 6 September 1970) is a Hungarian politician and Member of the European Parliament (MEP) from Hungary. She is a member of Fidesz.

Early life and education

Gál was born in Cluj-Napoca, Romania.

Her education details includes:
 Institute for Comparative Human Rights, Strasbourg, France diploma of international human rights (1993)
 Eötvös Loránd University, Budapest, Hungary political science and law department (1994)

Career
Following are Gál's career highlights prior to becoming an MEP:

 Democratic Union of Hungarians in Romania, Bucharest, Romania advisor (1991–1994)
 Teleki Foundation researcher (1996)
 Government Office for Hungarian Minorities Abroad analyst (1995), vice-chairman (2001–2002)
 European Centre for Minority Issues, Flensburg, Germany international legal expert (1997–2000)
 Hungarian Academy of Sciences chief advisor to the president (2003–2004)

European Parliament
 Member of the European Parliament - since 2004
 The Parliament Magazine's annual MEP Awards - The Justice and Civil Liberties category Award in 2014
 Vice-President of the European People's Party - since 2015. October

Committees and delegations

 Committee on Civil Liberties, Justice and Home Affairs, vice-chair
 Subcommittee on Human Rights, member
 Minority Intergroup, chair
 Delegation for the African, Caribbean, and Pacific Group of States - European Union JOINT PARLIAMENTARY ASSEMBLY, member
 Subcommittee on Security and Defense, member

Personal life
She is married to Máté Gál. They have four sons, Áron, Gergő, Zsombor and Márton.

Publications

 "Önrendelkezés és önkormányzatiság Kossuth felfogásában, 1861" (in Hungarian). Pro Minoritate. Budapest. 1991.
 "Kisebbségvédelem a nemzetközi jogban, Magyar Kisebbség" ["Protection of Minorities in International Law The Hungarian Minority"] (in Hungarian). II évfolyam, 1-2 szám, Kolozsvár. 1996.
 "A Román Parlament elé terjesztett kisebbségi törvény-tervezetek összehasonlítása" (in Hungarian).  Magyar Kisebbség, III. évfolyam, 1-2 szám, pp. 244–255, Kolozsvár. 1997.
 "Bilateral Agreements in Central and Eastern Europe: A New Inter-State Framework for Minority Protection?". European Centre for Minority Issues Working Paper # 4. p. 22. Flensburg, Germany. May 1999.
 "Implementing the Framework Convention for the Protection of National Minorities".  Co-author: María Amor Martín Estébanez.  Flensburg, Germany, 12–14 June 1998. European Centre for Minority Issues Report #3. p. 96. August 1999.
 "The role of the bilateral treaties in the protection of national minorities in Central and Eastern Europe".  Helsinki Monitor, Quarterly on Security and Cooperation in Europe. Volume 10, No.3, pp. 73–90, 1999.
 "Minoritätenprobleme in Ungarn und Rumänien".  In Neuss, Beate, Peter Jurczek and Wolfram Hilz (eds.) Transformationsprozesse im suedlichen Mitteleuropa — Ungarn und Rumänien. Beiträge zu einem politik- und regional-wissenschaftlichen Symposium an der TU Chemnitz. Occasional papers no. 20, Tuebingen: Europäisches Zentrum für Föderalismus- Forschung. pp. 31–41. 1999.
 "Innere Selbstbestimmung — Aktuelle Autonomiekonzepte der Minderheiten in Rumanien". In Löwe, Tontsch und Troebst, Minderheiten, Regionalbewusstsein und Zentralismus in Ostmitteleuropa, Böhlau Verlag Köln Weimar Wien. 2000.
 "The New Slovak language law: Internal or External Politics?".  Co-author: Farimah Daftary.  European Centre for Minority Issues Working Paper # 8. pp. 71. Flensburg, Germany.  September 2000.
 "The Council of Europe's Framework Convention for the Protection of National Minorities and its Impact on Central and Eastern Europe".  Journal on Ethnopolitics and Minority Issues in Europe.  Winter 2000.
 "Legal and Political Aspects of Protecting Minorities in Southeastern Europe in the Context of European Enlargement". In Wim van Meurs, Beyond EU Enlargement.  Bertelsmann Foundation Publishers, Gütersloh.2001.
 "Aktuelle Autonomiekonzepte ungarischer Minderheiten in Ostmitteleuropa".  In Adriányi, Glassl, Völkl, Borbándi, Brunner, Ungarn-Jahrbuch, Zeitschrift für die Kunde Ungarns und verwandte Gebiete. München. 2002.
 "Staatsangehörigkeit in Ungarn heute" ["Nationality in Hungary Today"].  In Osteuropa, Zeitschrift für Gegenwartsfragen des Ostens (in German), 52.Jg., 6/2002. Deutsche Verlags Anstalt, Stuttgart. 2002.
 Minority Governance at the Threshold of the 21st Century (ed.), European Centre for Minority Issues, Flensburg; Open Society Institute, Budapest. October 2002.
 "The European Parliament Intergroup for Traditional Minorities, National Communities and Languages, 2009–2014".  Europäisches Journal für Minderheitenfragen, EJM 3–4 (2010). Co-author: Davyth Hicks.
 "National Minorities in Inter-State Relations: Commentary from Country Perspective".  In National Minorities in Inter-State Relations'', edited by Francesco Palermo — Natalie Sabandze. Leiden, Boston. 2011.
 "Az európai kulturális sokszínűség régi és új arcai".  In Örökség a jövőnek — Nemzetközi Konferencia, Magyar Országgyűlés, November 2010, előadások, Budapest. 2011.
 "Traditional Minorities, National Communities and Languages – the issues raised in the European Parliament Intergroup 2009-2011" (PDF format). Co-authors: Davyth Hicks, Eplényi Kata.  Published by Kinga Gál, Brussels.  December 2011.

See also

 List of Hungarian people
 Members of the European Parliament for Hungary 2004–2009
 Members of the European Parliament for Hungary 2009–2014

References

External links
 
 gal.fidesz-eu.hu/en, her official MEP website
 

1970 births
20th-century Hungarian women politicians
Eötvös Loránd University alumni
Women MEPs for Hungary
Fidesz MEPs
MEPs for Hungary 2004–2009
MEPs for Hungary 2009–2014
MEPs for Hungary 2014–2019
MEPs for Hungary 2019–2024
Living people
Politicians from Cluj-Napoca
People from Flensburg